Granges-Aumontzey is a commune in the Vosges department of northeastern France. The municipality was established on 1 January 2016 and consists of the former communes of Aumontzey and Granges-sur-Vologne.

See also 
Communes of the Vosges department

References 

Communes of Vosges (department)